Diamantino José Vieira da Costa (born 29 February 1948) is a Portuguese retired footballer who played as a left winger

Over the course of 14 seasons, he amassed Primeira Liga totals of 215 games and eighteen goals, mainly at Benfica, where he won eight major titles.

Club career
Born in Portimão, Costa is a youth graduate from S.L. Benfica, he made his professional debut on 3 November 1966 against Ovarense, also scoring his first goal. After two seasons playing for the reserves, he went on loan to Varzim in 1968–69.

During the next seasons, he was mostly used as substitute for António Simões, winning 6 Primeira Liga's and two Taças de Portugal. On 26 November 1969, he scored the third goal against Celtic in a second-round game of the 1969–70 European Cup. After a final 3–3 on aggregate, Celtic passed on coin toss.

In 1977, Costa left Benfica and joined freshly created Team Hawaii, later moving to the Las Vegas Quicksilvers, reuniting with Eusébio. Following this brief period, he returned to his home town club Portimonense, earning a Segunda Divisão title in 1978–79. He played a further five seasons, mostly at Estoril-Praia, retiring at age 37.

Honours
Benfica
Portuguese League: 1970–71, 1971–72, 1972–73, 1974–75, 1975–76, 1976–77
Portuguese Cup: 1969–70, 1971–72

References

External links
 

1948 births
Living people
People from Portimão
Portuguese footballers
Association football wingers
Primeira Liga players
Liga Portugal 2 players
S.L. Benfica footballers
Varzim S.C. players
Team Hawaii players
Las Vegas Quicksilver players
Portimonense S.C. players
G.D. Estoril Praia players
Portugal youth international footballers
Portugal under-21 international footballers
Portuguese expatriate footballers
Expatriate soccer players in the United States
Portuguese expatriate sportspeople in the United States
North American Soccer League (1968–1984) players
Sportspeople from Faro District